Major General Winfield Wayne Scott III (born May 27, 1952) was Commander, Tanker Airlift Control Center, Scott Air Force Base, Illinois. The TACC is responsible for planning, scheduling and directing a fleet of more than 1,200 aircraft in support of combat delivery and strategic airlift, air refueling and aeromedical operations around the world.

The general graduated from the United States Military Academy in 1974 with a Bachelor of Science degree in military science, and earned a master of arts degree in 1983. He has commanded the 374th Operations Group at Yokota Air Base, Japan, the 47th Flying Training Wing at Laughlin AFB, Texas, and the 43rd Airlift Wing, Pope Air Force Base, North Carolina. The general also commanded the 64th Air Expeditionary Wing in support of Operation Iraqi Freedom. In addition, he served as the Inspector General for U.S. Transportation Command and Headquarters Air Mobility Command, which are located at Scott AFB, Illinois. Prior to his final assignment, he was Deputy Director of Programs, Office of the Deputy Chief of Staff for Plans and Programs.

Born in Ohio, he is the son of Lieutenant General Winfield W. Scott Jr.

Education
1974 Bachelor of Science degree in military science, U.S. Military Academy, West Point, New York
1983 Master of Arts degree in management, Webster University, Webster Groves, Missouri
1989 Air Command and Staff College, Maxwell AFB, Alabama
1995 National War College, Fort Lesley J. McNair, Washington, D.C.

Flight information
Rating: Command pilot
Flight hours: More than 5,600
Aircraft flown: C-141 Starlifter, C-130 Hercules, T-1 and UH-1N

Effective dates of promotion
Second Lieutenant June 5, 1974
First Lieutenant June 5, 1976
Captain June 5, 1978
Major November 1, 1985
Lieutenant Colonel October 1, 1990
Colonel August 1, 1996
Brigadier General August 1, 2002
Major General General September 1, 2005

References

External links
Notice of Promotion from Brig Gen to Maj Gen
Official US Air Force Biography

1952 births
Living people
United States Military Academy alumni
Military personnel from Ohio
Webster University alumni
Air Command and Staff College alumni
Recipients of the Meritorious Service Medal (United States)
National War College alumni
Recipients of the Legion of Merit
United States Air Force generals
Recipients of the Defense Superior Service Medal